Sackenomyia is a genus of gall midges, insects in the family Cecidomyiidae. There are about five described species in Sackenomyia.

Species
These five species belong to the genus Sackenomyia:
 Sackenomyia acerifoliae (Felt, 1907) i c g
 Sackenomyia commota Gagne, 1975 i c g b
 Sackenomyia reaumurii (Bremi, 1847) c g
 Sackenomyia ribesifolia Fedotova, 1987 c g
 Sackenomyia viburnifolia Felt, 1909 i
Data sources: i = ITIS, c = Catalogue of Life, g = GBIF, b = Bugguide.net

References

Further reading

 
 
 
 
 

Cecidomyiinae
Cecidomyiidae genera
Articles created by Qbugbot